The number  (spelled out as "pi") is a mathematical constant that is the ratio of a circle's circumference to its diameter, approximately equal to 3.14159. The number  appears in many formulae across mathematics and physics. Consequently, its decimal representation never ends, nor enters a permanently repeating pattern. It is a transcendental number, meaning that it cannot be a solution of an equation involving only sums, products, powers, and integers. The transcendence of  implies that it is impossible to solve the ancient challenge of squaring the circle with a compass and straightedge. The decimal digits of  appear to be randomly distributed, but no proof of this conjecture has been found.

Around 250BC, the Greek mathematician Archimedes created an algorithm to approximate  with arbitrary accuracy. In the 5th century AD, Chinese mathematicians approximated  to seven digits, while Indian mathematicians made a five-digit approximation, both using geometrical techniques. The earliest known use of the Greek letter π to represent the ratio of a circle's circumference to its diameter was by the Welsh mathematician William Jones in 1706.

These computations are motivated by the development of efficient algorithms to calculate numeric series, as well as the human quest to break records. The extensive computations involved have also been used to test supercomputers.

Because its definition relates to the circle,  is found in many formulae in trigonometry and geometry, especially those concerning circles, ellipses and spheres. It is also found in formulae from other topics in science, such as cosmology, fractals, thermodynamics, mechanics, and electromagnetism. In modern mathematical analysis, it is often instead defined without any reference to geometry; therefore, it also appears in areas having little to do with geometry, such as number theory and statistics. The ubiquity of  makes it one of the most widely known mathematical constants inside and outside of science. Several books devoted to  have been published, and record-setting calculations of the digits of  often result in news headlines.

Fundamentals

Name 
The symbol used by mathematicians to represent the ratio of a circle's circumference to its diameter is the lowercase Greek letter , sometimes spelled out as pi. In English,  is pronounced as "pie". In mathematical use, the lowercase letter  is distinguished from its capitalized and enlarged counterpart , which denotes a product of a sequence, analogous to how  denotes summation.

The choice of the symbol  is discussed in the section Adoption of the symbol .

Definition 

 is commonly defined as the ratio of a circle's circumference  to its diameter :

The ratio  is constant, regardless of the circle's size. For example, if a circle has twice the diameter of another circle, it will also have twice the circumference, preserving the ratio . This definition of  implicitly makes use of flat (Euclidean) geometry; although the notion of a circle can be extended to any curve (non-Euclidean) geometry, these new circles will no longer satisfy the formula .

Here, the circumference of a circle is the arc length around the perimeter of the circle, a quantity which can be formally defined independently of geometry using limits—a concept in calculus.  For example, one may directly compute the arc length of the top half of the unit circle, given in Cartesian coordinates by the equation , as the integral:

Integration is no longer commonly used in a first analytical definition because, as  explains, differential calculus typically precedes integral calculus in the university curriculum, so it is desirable to have a definition of  that does not rely on the latter.  One such definition, due to Richard Baltzer and popularized by Edmund Landau, is the following:  is twice the smallest positive number at which the cosine function equals 0.  is also the smallest positive number at which the sine function equals zero, and the difference between consecutive zeroes of the sine function. The cosine and sine can be defined independently of geometry as a power series, or as the solution of a differential equation.

In a similar spirit,  can be defined using properties of the complex exponential, of a complex variable . Like the cosine, the complex exponential can be defined in one of several ways.

and there is a unique positive real number  with this property.

A variation on the same idea, making use of sophisticated mathematical concepts of topology and algebra, is the following theorem: there is a unique (up to automorphism) continuous isomorphism from the group R/Z of real numbers under addition modulo integers (the circle group), onto the multiplicative group of complex numbers of absolute value one. The number  is then defined as half the magnitude of the derivative of this homomorphism.

Irrationality and normality 
 is an irrational number, meaning that it cannot be written as the ratio of two integers. Because  is irrational, it has an infinite number of digits in its decimal representation, and does not settle into an infinitely repeating pattern of digits. There are several proofs that  is irrational; they generally require calculus and rely on the reductio ad absurdum technique.

The digits of  have no apparent pattern and have passed tests for statistical randomness, including tests for normality; a number of infinite length is called normal when all possible sequences of digits (of any given length) appear equally often. The conjecture that  is normal has not been proven or disproven.

Since the advent of computers, a large number of digits of  have been available on which to perform statistical analysis. Any random sequence of digits contains arbitrarily long subsequences that appear non-random, by the infinite monkey theorem. This is also called the "Feynman point" in mathematical folklore, after Richard Feynman, although no connection to Feynman is known.

Transcendence 

Second, since no transcendental number can be constructed with compass and straightedge, it is not possible to "square the circle". In other words, it is impossible to construct, using compass and straightedge alone, a square whose area is exactly equal to the area of a given circle. Squaring a circle was one of the important geometry problems of the classical antiquity. Amateur mathematicians in modern times have sometimes attempted to square the circle and claim success—despite the fact that it is mathematically impossible.

Continued fractions 
As an irrational number,  cannot be represented as a common fraction. But every number, including , can be represented by an infinite series of nested fractions, called a continued fraction:

These numbers are among the best-known and most widely used historical approximations of the constant. Because  is transcendental, it is by definition not algebraic and so cannot be a quadratic irrational. Therefore,  cannot have a periodic continued fraction.

The middle of these is due to the mid-17th century mathematician William Brouncker, see § Brouncker's formula.

Approximate value and digits 
Some approximations of pi include:
 Integers: 3

Digits in other number systems
 The first five sexagesimal (base 60) digits are 3;8,29,44,0,47 (see )

Complex numbers and Euler's identity 

Any complex number, say , can be expressed using a pair of real numbers. In the polar coordinate system, one number (radius or r) is used to represent 's distance from the origin of the complex plane, and the other (angle or ) the counter-clockwise rotation from the positive real line:

where  is the imaginary unit satisfying  = −1.

where the constant  is the base of the natural logarithm. Setting  =  in Euler's formula results in Euler's identity, celebrated in mathematics due to it containing five important mathematical constants:

There are  different complex numbers  satisfying , and these are called the "-th roots of unity" and are given by the formula:

History

Antiquity 
The best-known approximations to  dating before the Common Era were accurate to two decimal places; this was improved upon in Chinese mathematics in particular by the mid-first millennium, to an accuracy of seven decimal places.
After this, no further progress was made until the late medieval period.

In Babylon, a clay tablet dated 1900–1600 BC has a geometrical statement that, by implication, treats  as  = 3.125. In Egypt, the Rhind Papyrus, dated around 1650 BC but copied from a document dated to 1850 BC, has a formula for the area of a circle that treats  as  3.16.
In the Shulba Sutras of Indian mathematics, dating to an oral tradition from the first or second millennium BC, approximations are given which have been variously interpreted as approximately 3.08831, 3.08833, 3.004, 3, or 3.125.

Polygon approximation era 

This polygonal algorithm dominated for over 1,000 years, and as a result  is sometimes referred to as Archimedes's constant. By calculating the perimeters of these polygons, he proved that  (that is ).

Liu later invented a faster method of calculating  and obtained a value of 3.14 with a 96-sided polygon, by taking advantage of the fact that the differences in area of successive polygons form a geometric series with a factor of 4. The Chinese mathematician Zu Chongzhi, around 480 AD, calculated that  and suggested the approximations  = 3.14159292035... and  = 3.142857142857..., which he termed the Milü (''close ratio") and Yuelü ("approximate ratio"), respectively, using Liu Hui's algorithm applied to a 12,288-sided polygon. With a correct value for its seven first decimal digits, this value remained the most accurate approximation of  available for the next 800 years.

The Indian astronomer Aryabhata used a value of 3.1416 in his Āryabhaṭīya (499 AD). Fibonacci in c. 1220 computed 3.1418 using a polygonal method, independent of Archimedes. Italian author Dante apparently employed the value .

The Persian astronomer Jamshīd al-Kāshī produced 9 sexagesimal digits, roughly the equivalent of 16 decimal digits, in 1424 using a polygon with 3×228 sides, which stood as the world record for about 180 years. French mathematician François Viète in 1579 achieved 9 digits with a polygon of 3×217 sides. Flemish mathematician Adriaan van Roomen arrived at 15 decimal places in 1593. In 1596, Dutch mathematician Ludolph van Ceulen reached 20 digits, a record he later increased to 35 digits (as a result,  was called the "Ludolphian number" in Germany until the early 20th century). Dutch scientist Willebrord Snellius reached 34 digits in 1621, and Austrian astronomer Christoph Grienberger arrived at 38 digits in 1630 using 1040 sides. Christiaan Huygens was able to arrive at 10 decimal places in 1654 using a slightly different method equivalent to Richardson extrapolation.

Infinite series 

An infinite series is the sum of the terms of an infinite sequence. Infinite series allowed mathematicians to compute  with much greater precision than Archimedes and others who used geometrical techniques. Although infinite series were exploited for  most notably by European mathematicians such as James Gregory and Gottfried Wilhelm Leibniz, the approach also appeared in the Kerala school sometime in the 14th or 15th century. Around 1500 AD, a written description of an infinite series that could be used to compute  was laid out in Sanskrit verse in Tantrasamgraha by Nilakantha Somayaji. The series are presented without proof, but proofs are presented in a later work, Yuktibhāṣā, from around 1530 AD. Several infinite series are described, including series for sine (which Nilakantha attributes to Madhava of Sangamagrama), cosine, and arctangent which are now sometimes referred to as Madhava series. The series for arctangent is sometimes called Gregory's series or the Gregory–Leibniz series. Madhava used infinite series to estimate  to 11 digits around 1400.

In 1593, François Viète published what is now known as Viète's formula, an infinite product (rather than an infinite sum, which is more typically used in  calculations):

In 1655, John Wallis published what is now known as Wallis product, also an infinite product:

In the 1660s, the English scientist Isaac Newton and German mathematician Gottfried Wilhelm Leibniz discovered calculus, which led to the development of many infinite series for approximating .

In 1671, James Gregory, and independently, Leibniz in 1673, discovered the Taylor series expansion for arctangent:

But for  it converges impractically slowly (that is, approaches the answer very gradually), taking about ten times as many terms to calculate each additional digit.

In 1706, John Machin used the Gregory–Leibniz series to produce an algorithm that converged much faster:

Isaac Newton accelerated the convergence of the Gregory–Leibniz series in 1684 (in an unpublished work; others independently discovered the result):

Machin-like formulae remained the best-known method for calculating  well into the age of computers, and were used to set records for 250 years, culminating in a 620-digit approximation in 1946 by Daniel Ferguson – the best approximation achieved without the aid of a calculating device.

In 1853, British mathematician William Shanks calculated  to 607 digits, but made a mistake in the 528th digit, rendering all subsequent digits incorrect. Though he calculated an additional 100 digits in 1873, bringing the total up to 707, his previous mistake rendered all the new digits incorrect as well.

Rate of convergence 
Some infinite series for  converge faster than others.

The following table compares the convergence rates of these two series:

Series that converge even faster include Machin's series and Chudnovsky's series, the latter producing 14 correct decimal digits per term.

Irrationality and transcendence 

Swiss scientist Johann Heinrich Lambert in 1768 proved that  is irrational, meaning it is not equal to the quotient of any two integers. Lambert's proof exploited a continued-fraction representation of the tangent function. French mathematician Adrien-Marie Legendre proved in 1794 that 2 is also irrational. In 1882, German mathematician Ferdinand von Lindemann proved that  is transcendental, confirming a conjecture made by both Legendre and Euler. Hardy and Wright states that "the proofs were afterwards modified and simplified by Hilbert, Hurwitz, and other writers".

Adoption of the symbol  

Barrow likewise used  to represent the constant , while Gregory instead used  to represent .

The earliest known use of the Greek letter  alone to represent the ratio of a circle's circumference to its diameter was by Welsh mathematician William Jones in his 1706 work ; or, a New Introduction to the Mathematics. The Greek letter appears on p. 243 in the phrase " Periphery", calculated for a circle with radius one. Jones' notation was not immediately adopted by other mathematicians, with the fraction notation still being used as late as 1767.

Euler started using the single-letter form beginning with his 1727 Essay Explaining the Properties of Air, though he used , the ratio of periphery to radius, in this and some later writing.

Modern quest for more digits

Computer era and iterative algorithms 

Mathematicians John Wrench and Levi Smith reached 1,120 digits in 1949 using a desk calculator. Using an inverse tangent (arctan) infinite series, a team led by George Reitwiesner and John von Neumann that same year achieved 2,037 digits with a calculation that took 70 hours of computer time on the ENIAC computer. The record, always relying on an arctan series, was broken repeatedly (7,480 digits in 1957; 10,000 digits in 1958; 100,000 digits in 1961) until 1 million digits were reached in 1973.

Two additional developments around 1980 once again accelerated the ability to compute . First, the discovery of new iterative algorithms for computing , which were much faster than the infinite series; and second, the invention of fast multiplication algorithms that could multiply large numbers very rapidly. Such algorithms are particularly important in modern  computations because most of the computer's time is devoted to multiplication. They include the Karatsuba algorithm, Toom–Cook multiplication, and Fourier transform-based methods.

The iterative algorithms were independently published in 1975–1976 by physicist Eugene Salamin and scientist Richard Brent. These avoid reliance on infinite series. An iterative algorithm repeats a specific calculation, each iteration using the outputs from prior steps as its inputs, and produces a result in each step that converges to the desired value. The approach was actually invented over 160 years earlier by Carl Friedrich Gauss, in what is now termed the arithmetic–geometric mean method (AGM method) or Gauss–Legendre algorithm. As modified by Salamin and Brent, it is also referred to as the Brent–Salamin algorithm.

The iterative algorithms were widely used after 1980 because they are faster than infinite series algorithms: whereas infinite series typically increase the number of correct digits additively in successive terms, iterative algorithms generally multiply the number of correct digits at each step. For example, the Brent–Salamin algorithm doubles the number of digits in each iteration. In 1984, brothers John and Peter Borwein produced an iterative algorithm that quadruples the number of digits in each step; and in 1987, one that increases the number of digits five times in each step. Iterative methods were used by Japanese mathematician Yasumasa Kanada to set several records for computing  between 1995 and 2002. This rapid convergence comes at a price: the iterative algorithms require significantly more memory than infinite series.

Motives for computing  

For most numerical calculations involving , a handful of digits provide sufficient precision. According to Jörg Arndt and Christoph Haenel, thirty-nine digits are sufficient to perform most cosmological calculations, because that is the accuracy necessary to calculate the circumference of the observable universe with a precision of one atom. Accounting for additional digits needed to compensate for computational round-off errors, Arndt concludes that a few hundred digits would suffice for any scientific application. Despite this, people have worked strenuously to compute  to thousands and millions of digits. This effort may be partly ascribed to the human compulsion to break records, and such achievements with  often make headlines around the world.

Rapidly convergent series 

Modern  calculators do not use iterative algorithms exclusively. New infinite series were discovered in the 1980s and 1990s that are as fast as iterative algorithms, yet are simpler and less memory intensive. One of his formulae, based on modular equations, is

This series converges much more rapidly than most arctan series, including Machin's formula. Ramanujan's formulae anticipated the modern algorithms developed by the Borwein brothers (Jonathan and Peter) and the Chudnovsky brothers. The Chudnovsky formula developed in 1987 is

For similar formulae, see also the Ramanujan–Sato series.

Monte Carlo methods 

Buffon's needle is one such technique: If a needle of length  is dropped  times on a surface on which parallel lines are drawn  units apart, and if  of those times it comes to rest crossing a line ( > 0), then one may approximate  based on the counts:

Another Monte Carlo method for computing  is to draw a circle inscribed in a square, and randomly place dots in the square. The ratio of dots inside the circle to the total number of dots will approximately equal .

Another way to calculate  using probability is to start with a random walk, generated by a sequence of (fair) coin tosses: independent random variables  such that  with equal probabilities.  The associated random walk is

so that, for each ,  is drawn from a shifted and scaled binomial distribution.  As  varies,  defines a (discrete) stochastic process.  Then  can be calculated by

This Monte Carlo method is independent of any relation to circles, and is a consequence of the central limit theorem, discussed below.

These Monte Carlo methods for approximating  are very slow compared to other methods, and do not provide any information on the exact number of digits that are obtained. Thus they are never used to approximate  when speed or accuracy is desired.

Spigot algorithms 
Two algorithms were discovered in 1995 that opened up new avenues of research into . They are called spigot algorithms because, like water dripping from a spigot, they produce single digits of  that are not reused after they are calculated. This is in contrast to infinite series or iterative algorithms, which retain and use all intermediate digits until the final result is produced.

Mathematicians Stan Wagon and Stanley Rabinowitz produced a simple spigot algorithm in 1995. Its speed is comparable to arctan algorithms, but not as fast as iterative algorithms.

Another spigot algorithm, the BBP digit extraction algorithm, was discovered in 1995 by Simon Plouffe:

This formula, unlike others before it, can produce any individual hexadecimal digit of  without calculating all the preceding digits. Individual binary digits may be extracted from individual hexadecimal digits, and octal digits can be extracted from one or two hexadecimal digits. Variations of the algorithm have been discovered, but no digit extraction algorithm has yet been found that rapidly produces decimal digits. An important application of digit extraction algorithms is to validate new claims of record  computations: After a new record is claimed, the decimal result is converted to hexadecimal, and then a digit extraction algorithm is used to calculate several random hexadecimal digits near the end; if they match, this provides a measure of confidence that the entire computation is correct.

Role and characterizations in mathematics 
Because  is closely related to the circle, it is found in many formulae from the fields of geometry and trigonometry, particularly those concerning circles, spheres, or ellipses. Other branches of science, such as statistics, physics, Fourier analysis, and number theory, also include  in some of their important formulae.

Geometry and trigonometry 

 appears in formulae for areas and volumes of geometrical shapes based on circles, such as ellipses, spheres, cones, and tori. Below are some of the more common formulae that involve .
Some of the formulae above are special cases of the volume of the n-dimensional ball and the surface area of its boundary, the (n−1)-dimensional sphere, given below.

Apart from circles, there are other curves of constant width. By Barbier's theorem, every curve of constant width has perimeter  times its width. The Reuleaux triangle (formed by the intersection of three circles with the sides of an equilateral triangle as their radii) has the smallest possible area for its width and the circle the largest. There also exist non-circular smooth and even algebraic curves of constant width.

Definite integrals that describe circumference, area, or volume of shapes generated by circles typically have values that involve . For example, an integral that specifies half the area of a circle of radius one is given by:

In that integral the function  represents the height over the -axis of a semicircle (the square root is a consequence of the Pythagorean theorem), and the integral computes the area below the semicircle.

Units of angle 

The trigonometric functions rely on angles, and mathematicians generally use radians as units of measurement.  plays an important role in angles measured in radians, which are defined so that a complete circle spans an angle of 2 radians. The angle measure of 180° is equal to  radians, and 1° = /180 radians.

Eigenvalues 

However,  also appears in many natural situations having apparently nothing to do with geometry.

In many applications, it plays a distinguished role as an eigenvalue. For example, an idealized vibrating string can be modelled as the graph of a function  on the unit interval , with fixed ends . Thus  is an eigenvalue of the second derivative operator , and is constrained by Sturm–Liouville theory to take on only certain specific values. It must be positive, since the operator is negative definite, so it is convenient to write , where  is called the wavenumber.

The value  is, in fact, the least such value of the wavenumber, and is associated with the fundamental mode of vibration of the string.

Here  appears as an optimal constant in Wirtinger's inequality, and it follows that it is the smallest wavenumber, using the variational characterization of the eigenvalue. As a consequence,  is the smallest singular value of the derivative operator on the space of functions on  vanishing at both endpoints (the Sobolev space ).

Inequalities 

The number  serves appears in similar eigenvalue problems in higher-dimensional analysis.  As mentioned above, it can be characterized via its role as the best constant in the isoperimetric inequality: the area  enclosed by a plane Jordan curve of perimeter  satisfies the inequality

In two dimensions, the critical Sobolev inequality is

The Sobolev inequality is equivalent to the isoperimetric inequality (in any dimension), with the same best constants.

Wirtinger's inequality also generalizes to higher-dimensional Poincaré inequalities that provide best constants for the Dirichlet energy of an n-dimensional membrane.  Specifically,  is the greatest constant such that

Just as Wirtinger's inequality is the variational form of the Dirichlet eigenvalue problem in one dimension, the Poincaré inequality is the variational form of the Neumann eigenvalue problem, in any dimension.

Fourier transform and Heisenberg uncertainty principle 

The constant  also appears as a critical spectral parameter in the Fourier transform.  This is the integral transform, that takes a complex-valued integrable function  on the real line to the function defined as:

Although there are several different conventions for the Fourier transform and its inverse, any such convention must involve  somewhere.

The Heisenberg uncertainty principle also contains the number .  The uncertainty principle gives a sharp lower bound on the extent to which it is possible to localize a function both in space and in frequency: with our conventions for the Fourier transform,

The physical consequence, about the uncertainty in simultaneous position and momentum observations of a quantum mechanical system, is discussed below.

Gaussian integrals 

The fields of probability and statistics frequently use the normal distribution as a simple model for complex phenomena; for example, scientists generally assume that the observational error in most experiments follows a normal distribution. The Gaussian function, which is the probability density function of the normal distribution with mean  and standard deviation , naturally contains :

The factor of  makes the area under the graph of   equal to one, as is required for a probability distribution. This follows from a change of variables in the Gaussian integral:

Equivalently,  is the unique constant making the Gaussian normal distribution  equal to its own Fourier transform.

Topology 

The constant  appears in the Gauss–Bonnet formula which relates the differential geometry of surfaces to their topology.  Specifically, if a compact surface  has Gauss curvature K, then

where  is the Euler characteristic, which is an integer.  An example is the surface area of a sphere S of curvature 1 (so that its radius of curvature, which coincides with its radius, is also 1.)  The Euler characteristic of a sphere can be computed from its homology groups and is found to be equal to two.  Thus we have

reproducing the formula for the surface area of a sphere of radius 1.

The constant appears in many other integral formulae in topology, in particular, those involving characteristic classes via the Chern–Weil homomorphism.

Cauchy's integral formula 

One of the key tools in complex analysis is contour integration of a function over a positively oriented (rectifiable) Jordan curve .

Although the curve  is not a circle, and hence does not have any obvious connection to the constant , a standard proof of this result uses Morera's theorem, which implies that the integral is invariant under homotopy of the curve, so that it can be deformed to a circle and then integrated explicitly in polar coordinates.  More generally, it is true that if a rectifiable closed curve  does not contain , then the above integral is  times the winding number of the curve.

The gamma function and Stirling's approximation 

The factorial function  is the product of all of the positive integers through . The gamma function extends the concept of factorial (normally defined only for non-negative integers) to all complex numbers, except the negative real integers, with the identity . When the gamma function is evaluated at half-integers, the result contains .

The gamma function is defined by its Weierstrass product development:

where  is the Euler–Mascheroni constant. The gamma function is also connected to the Riemann zeta function and identities for the functional determinant, in which the constant  plays an important role.

The gamma function is used to calculate the volume  of the n-dimensional ball of radius r in Euclidean n-dimensional space, and the surface area  of its boundary, the (n−1)-dimensional sphere:

Further, it follows from the functional equation that

The gamma function can be used to create a simple approximation to the factorial function  for large :  which is known as Stirling's approximation.  Equivalently,

Then

Ehrhart's volume conjecture is that this is the (optimal) upper bound on the volume of a convex body containing only one lattice point.

Number theory and Riemann zeta function 

The Riemann zeta function  is used in many areas of mathematics. When evaluated at  it can be written as

Finding a simple solution for this infinite series was a famous problem in mathematics called the Basel problem. For distinct primes, these divisibility events are mutually independent; so the probability that two numbers are relatively prime is given by a product over all primes:

This probability can be used in conjunction with a random number generator to approximate  using a Monte Carlo approach.

The solution to the Basel problem implies that the geometrically derived quantity  is connected in a deep way to the distribution of prime numbers.  This is a special case of Weil's conjecture on Tamagawa numbers, which asserts the equality of similar such infinite products of arithmetic quantities, localized at each prime p, and a geometrical quantity: the reciprocal of the volume of a certain locally symmetric space.  In the case of the Basel problem, it is the hyperbolic 3-manifold .

The zeta function also satisfies Riemann's functional equation, which involves  as well as the gamma function:

Furthermore, the derivative of the zeta function satisfies

A consequence is that  can be obtained from the functional determinant of the harmonic oscillator.  This functional determinant can be computed via a product expansion, and is equivalent to the Wallis product formula.  The calculation can be recast in quantum mechanics, specifically the variational approach to the spectrum of the hydrogen atom.

Fourier series 

The constant  also appears naturally in Fourier series of periodic functions. Periodic functions are functions on the group  of fractional parts of real numbers.

Using the Haar measure on the circle group, the constant  is half the magnitude of the Radon–Nikodym derivative of this character. The other characters have derivatives whose magnitudes are positive integral multiples of 2. As a result, the constant  is the unique number such that the group T, equipped with its Haar measure, is Pontrjagin dual to the lattice of integral multiples of 2. This is a version of the one-dimensional Poisson summation formula.

Modular forms and theta functions 

The constant  is connected in a deep way with the theory of modular forms and theta functions.  For example, the Chudnovsky algorithm involves in an essential way the j-invariant of an elliptic curve.

Modular forms are holomorphic functions in the upper half plane characterized by their transformation properties under the modular group  (or its various subgroups), a lattice in the group .  An example is the Jacobi theta function

which is a kind of modular form called a Jacobi form.  This is sometimes written in terms of the nome .

The constant  is the unique constant making the Jacobi theta function an automorphic form, which means that it transforms in a specific way.  Certain identities hold for all automorphic forms.  An example is

which implies that  transforms as a representation under the discrete Heisenberg group.  General modular forms and other theta functions also involve , once again because of the Stone–von Neumann theorem.

Cauchy distribution and potential theory 

The Cauchy distribution

is a probability density function.  The total probability is equal to one, owing to the integral:

The Cauchy distribution plays an important role in potential theory because it is the simplest Furstenberg measure, the classical Poisson kernel associated with a Brownian motion in a half-plane. Conjugate harmonic functions and so also the Hilbert transform are associated with the asymptotics of the Poisson kernel. The Hilbert transform H is the integral transform given by the Cauchy principal value of the singular integral

The constant  is the unique (positive) normalizing factor such that H defines a linear complex structure on the Hilbert space of square-integrable real-valued functions on the real line.  The Hilbert transform, like the Fourier transform, can be characterized purely in terms of its transformation properties on the Hilbert space : up to a normalization factor, it is the unique bounded linear operator that commutes with positive dilations and anti-commutes with all reflections of the real line.  The constant  is the unique normalizing factor that makes this transformation unitary.

In the Mandelbrot set

Outside mathematics

Describing physical phenomena 
Although not a physical constant,  appears routinely in equations describing fundamental principles of the universe, often because of 's relationship to the circle and to spherical coordinate systems. A simple formula from the field of classical mechanics gives the approximate period  of a simple pendulum of length , swinging with a small amplitude ( is the earth's gravitational acceleration):

One of the key formulae of quantum mechanics is Heisenberg's uncertainty principle, which shows that the uncertainty in the measurement of a particle's position (Δ) and momentum (Δ) cannot both be arbitrarily small at the same time (where  is the Planck constant):

The fact that  is approximately equal to 3 plays a role in the relatively long lifetime of orthopositronium. The inverse lifetime to lowest order in the fine-structure constant  is

where  is the mass of the electron.

 is present in some structural engineering formulae, such as the buckling formula derived by Euler, which gives the maximum axial load  that a long, slender column of length , modulus of elasticity , and area moment of inertia  can carry without buckling:

The field of fluid dynamics contains  in Stokes' law, which approximates the frictional force  exerted on small, spherical objects of radius , moving with velocity  in a fluid with dynamic viscosity :

In electromagnetics, the vacuum permeability constant μ0 appears in Maxwell's equations, which describe the properties of electric and magnetic fields and electromagnetic radiation. Before 20 May 2019, it was defined as exactly

Under ideal conditions (uniform gentle slope on a homogeneously erodible substrate), the sinuosity of a meandering river approaches . The sinuosity is the ratio between the actual length and the straight-line distance from source to mouth. Faster currents along the outside edges of a river's bends cause more erosion than along the inside edges, thus pushing the bends even farther out, and increasing the overall loopiness of the river. However, that loopiness eventually causes the river to double back on itself in places and "short-circuit", creating an ox-bow lake in the process.

Memorizing digits 

In 2006, Akira Haraguchi, a retired Japanese engineer, claimed to have recited 100,000 decimal places, but the claim was not verified by Guinness World Records.

One common technique is to memorize a story or poem in which the word lengths represent the digits of : The first word has three letters, the second word has one, the third has four, the fourth has one, the fifth has five, and so on. Such memorization aids are called mnemonics. An early example of a mnemonic for pi, originally devised by English scientist James Jeans, is "How I want a drink, alcoholic of course, after the heavy lectures involving quantum mechanics." When a poem is used, it is sometimes referred to as a piem. Poems for memorizing  have been composed in several languages in addition to English.  Record-setting  memorizers typically do not rely on poems, but instead use methods such as remembering number patterns and the method of loci.

In popular culture 

Perhaps because of the simplicity of its definition and its ubiquitous presence in formulae,  has been represented in popular culture more than other mathematical constructs.

In the 2008 Open University and BBC documentary co-production, The Story of Maths, aired in October 2008 on BBC Four, British mathematician Marcus du Sautoy shows a visualization of the – historically first exact – formula for calculating  when visiting India and exploring its contributions to trigonometry.

In the Palais de la Découverte (a science museum in Paris) there is a circular room known as the pi room. The digits are large wooden characters attached to the dome-like ceiling. The digits were based on an 1873 calculation by English mathematician William Shanks, which included an error beginning at the 528th digit. The error was detected in 1946 and corrected in 1949.

The digits of  have also been incorporated into the lyrics of the song "Pi" from the 2005 album Aerial by Kate Bush. In the 1967 Star Trek episode "Wolf in the Fold", an out-of-control computer is contained by being instructed to "Compute to the last digit the value of ".

In the United States, Pi Day falls on 14 March (written 3/14 in the US style), and is popular among students.  and its digital representation are often used by self-described "math geeks" for inside jokes among mathematically and technologically minded groups. A college cheer variously attributed to the Massachusetts Institute of Technology or the Rensselaer Polytechnic Institute includes "3.14159". Pi Day in 2015 was particularly significant because the date and time 3/14/15 9:26:53 reflected many more digits of pi. In parts of the world where dates are commonly noted in day/month/year format, 22 July represents "Pi Approximation Day", as 22/7 = 3.142857.

During the 2011 auction for Nortel's portfolio of valuable technology patents, Google made a series of unusually specific bids based on mathematical and scientific constants, including .

 
This use of  has not made its way into mainstream mathematics, but has been added to several programming languages as a predefined constant.

The bill is notorious as an attempt to establish a value of mathematical constant by legislative fiat. The bill was passed by the Indiana House of Representatives, but rejected by the Senate, meaning it did not become a law.

In computer culture 
In contemporary internet culture, individuals and organizations frequently pay homage to the number . For instance, the computer scientist Donald Knuth let the version numbers of his program TeX approach . The versions are 3, 3.1, 3.14, and so forth.

See also 
 Approximations of 
 Chronology of computation of 
 List of mathematical constants

References

Notes

Citations

Sources 

  English translation by Catriona and David Lischka.

Further reading

External links 

 

 
Complex analysis
Mathematical series
Real transcendental numbers